The Composite Gazetteer of Antarctica (CGA) of the Scientific Committee on Antarctic Research (SCAR) is the authoritative international gazetteer containing all Antarctic toponyms published in national gazetteers, plus basic information about those names and the relevant geographical features. The Gazetteer includes also parts of the International Hydrographic Organization (IHO) General Bathymetric Chart of the Oceans (GEBCO) gazetteer for under-sea features situated south of 60° south latitude.

, the overall content of the CGA amounts to 37,893 geographic names for 19,803 features including some 500 features with two or more entirely different names, contributed by the following sources:

National Authorities for Antarctic place-names
Country / Official authority

Argentina: Instituto Geográfico Nacional, Servicio de Hidrografía Naval
Australia: Australian Antarctic Names and Medals Committee
Bulgaria: Antarctic Place-names Commission
Canada: Geographical Names Board of Canada
Chile: Instituto Hidrográfíco y Oceanográfico de la Armada de Chile (SHOA) and Instituto Geográfico Militar (IGM)
China: Chinese Place-names Committee
France: Commission de Toponymie des TAAF, Institut Géographique National (Commission of Toponymy of TAAF, National Geographic Institute)
Germany: Ständiger Ausschuß für Geographische Namen (Permanent committee on geographical names)
Italy: Comitato per i nomi geografici antartici (Antarctic geographic names Committee)
Japan: Antarctic Place-names Committee of Japan
New Zealand: Antarctic Place-names Committee of New Zealand
Norway: Antarctic Place-names Committee of Norway, Norsk Polarinstitutt
Poland: Committee of Polar Research of the Polish Academy of Sciences
Russia: Russian Interministerial Commission on Geographical Names
UK: British Antarctic Survey UK Antarctic Place-names Committee
Uruguay: Instituto Antártico Uruguayo
United States: United States Board on Geographic Names
GEBCO: GEBCO Sub-Committee on Undersea Feature Names

External links
 Composite Gazetteer of Antarctica (official website)
 SCAR Composite Gazetteer of Antarctica (CGA). NASA Global Change Master Directory (GCMD).
 Antarctic Digital Database (ADD). Scale 1:250000 topographic map of Antarctica with place-name search. Scientific Committee on Antarctic Research (SCAR). Since 1993, regularly upgraded and updated.

Names of places in Antarctica
Gazetteers